Royal Oaks Golf Club is an 18-hole par 72 links style golf club. Opened in July 2000, the course is in Moncton, New Brunswick, Canada. It is the first course in Canada to be designed by U.S. Open Architect Rees Jones. It was built to US Open standards. A new up-scale residential development was developed around the course which includes a 4-story condominium complex that opened in 2007.

See also
 Moncton Sport Facilities
 List of golf courses in New Brunswick

References
Golf NB
Course Info
Condo Info

External links
Official website

Golf clubs and courses in New Brunswick
Sports venues in Moncton
Golf clubs and courses designed by Rees Jones